Iocrinus is an extinct genus of crinoid (sea lilies and feather stars). It is an early form of crinoid, from the Ordovician rock of North America, England, and Gilwern Hill, Powys in Wales.

Selected species 
 Iocrinus brithdirensis
 Iocrinus crassus
 Iocrinus pauli
 Iocrinus shelvensis
 Iocrinus similis
 Iocrinus subcrassus
 Iocrinus trentonensis
 Iocrinus whitteryi

References 

 Paleobiology Database entry
 Iocrinus in the Ordovician of England and Wales
 Stuart M. Kelly, Functional Morphology and Evolution of Iocrinus: An Ordovician Disparid Inadunate Crinoid, Indiana University, 1978.

Iocrinidae
Ordovician crinoids
Ordovician echinoderms of Europe
Ordovician echinoderms of North America
Paleozoic life of Ontario
Verulam Formation